Sheikha Azza bint Sultan Al Qasimi (born 1973) is an Emirati artist and businesswoman.

She is the daughter of Sultan bin Muhammad Al-Qasimi, the sovereign ruler of the Emirate of Sharjah. She was educated in Dubai and at St Anthony's College, Oxford. She has joined in group exhibitions in United Arab Emirates, Jordan, Egypt, China and the United Kingdom. Her first solo exhibition was at the University of Oxford.

References

1973 births
Living people
Emirati artists
Emirati women artists
Emirati women in business
Azza
Daughters of monarchs